El Vellón is a municipality of the Community of Madrid, Spain. It is known for the Watchtower of El Vellón.

Transport system 
El Vellón has three line buses, all of them operated by ALSA. Two of them connect the village with Madrid. These lines are: 

Line 191: Madrid (Plaza de Castilla) - Buitrago

Line 193: Madrid (Plaza de Castilla) - Pedrezuela - El Vellón

Line  197D: Torrelaguna - El Vellón - El Molar

References 

Municipalities in the Community of Madrid